Arsen Norayrovich Zakharyan (born 26 May 2003) is a Russian professional footballer who plays as a midfielder for Dynamo Moscow and the Russian national team.

Early life
Zakharyan was born in Samara, Russia into an ethnic Armenian family. Arsen's parents moved from Martakert, Nagorno-Karabakh to Russia after the Nagorno-Karabakh war (1991–1994).

Club career

Dynamo Moscow

2020–21 season 
Zakharyan made his debut in the Russian Premier League for Dynamo Moscow on 1 November 2020, in a game against FC Tambov during the 2020–21 season. He made his first starting lineup appearance for Dynamo in the first league game after the winter break, on 28 February 2021, scoring his first goal in a 2–1 away win against FC Akhmat Grozny. He became the third-youngest Dynamo player to score a goal in the Russian Premier League, after Aleksandr Kokorin and Pyotr Nemov.

Zakharyan was nominated player of the month for February, March and May 2021 by Dynamo fans thanks to his performances, including a late winner against CSKA Moscow in May. He was voted as player of the 2020–21 season by Dynamo fans, and the Russian Football Union (RFS) nominated him best under-21 player of the season.

2021–22 season 
Zaharyan's first goal of the 2021–22 season came on 23 July 2021, opening the score in a 2–0 away victory over FC Rostov; he was also selected as player of the game. On 9 December 2021, the Russian Premier League awarded him as the league's best under-21 player of 2021.

Zakharyan was voted player of the season by Dynamo fans for the second season in a row. He also finished second in the vote for the best under-21 player of the league season, losing out to league's top scorer Gamid Agalarov. The RFS also named him best young player and the best left midfielder of the 2021–22 season.

2022–23 season 
On 1 September 2022, Dynamo announced that the club received an offer for Zakharyan's transfer from Premier League club Chelsea on 25 August 2022 and the clubs were negotiating since, but the transfer would not be possible in the summer 2022 transfer window "for a number of technical reasons beyond our control". Dynamo's bank and former owner VTB Bank was sanctioned by the government of Great Britain in February 2022 following the 2022 Russian invasion of Ukraine. He was voted player of the month by Dynamo fans for September 2022 and October 2022.

International career

Youth 
On 15 March 2021, Zakharyan was selected for Russia U21's squad for the 2021 UEFA European Under-21 Championship. He had previously represented Russia up to the under-17s and became the youngest player on Russia's squad. In his debut on 25 March 2021, in the opening game against Iceland, Zakharyan was fouled in the penalty box in the 31st minute, and Russia opened scoring from the penalty kick. In the added time of the first half he scored his first goal to make the score 3–0, with the game eventually ending with a 4–1 victory for Russia. Zakharyan became the youngest goalscorer for Russia U21, and the youngest goalscorer in the history of the UEFA European Under-21 Championship, overtaking Yari Verschaeren.

Senior 
On 11 May 2021, Zakharyan received his first call-up to the senior Russia team, and was included in the preliminary extended 30-man squad for UEFA Euro 2020. He suffered a tonsillitis infection in camp and was not included in the final squad. 

Zakharyan made his debut for the senior squad on 1 September 2021, in a 2022 World Cup qualifier against Croatia. He started the game and was substituted in the second half, as the game ended in a 0–0 draw. He became the youngest outfield player in Russian national team history, aged , overtaking Alan Dzagoev. Zakharyan also became the second-youngest national team player overall, behind goalkeeper Igor Akinfeev. Both his and Akinfeev's records were beaten by Sergei Pinyayev in 2022.

Style of play
Zakharyan is a versatile player and is deployed in multiple offensive positions, as a wide midfielder on either flank, attacking midfielder or central midfielder. In some games he switches positions throughout the game as the tactics demand. His characteristics, such as his finishing, passing ability and playing style, have led Zakharyan to be compared with Belgian international Kevin De Bruyne, and have led Zakharyan to be compared with Rumanian international Alexandru Cicaldau.

In October 2020, he was chosen as one of the 60 of the best young talents in world football among the players born in 2003 by The Guardian.

Career statistics

Club

International

References

External links
 

2003 births
Sportspeople from Samara, Russia
Living people
Russian footballers
Russia youth international footballers
Russia under-21 international footballers
Russia international footballers
Association football midfielders
FC Dynamo Moscow players
Russian Premier League players
Russian Second League players
Russian people of Armenian descent
Russian sportspeople of Armenian descent
Ethnic Armenian sportspeople
Armenian footballers